Harungana montana is a species of tree in the family Hypericaceae. It is one of two species in the genus Harungana, with the other one being Harungana madagascariensis. It can be found in rainforests at altitudes of 2000–3000 meters in the Democratic Republic of the Congo, Rwanda, and Burundi. The species is a tree that grows 15–20 meters tall with young branches and tomentose leaves.

References

montana